East of Borneo is a 1931 American Pre-Code adventure film directed by George Melford, co-written by Edwin H. Knopf and Dale Van Every, starring Rose Hobart, Charles Bickford, Georges Renavent, Lupita Tovar, and Noble Johnson, and released by Universal Studios.

In 1936, artist Joseph Cornell edited this feature film into his short experimental film Rose Hobart which runs about 19 minutes.

Plot
Linda Randolph looks for her husband on the island of Marado just east of Borneo. Although Linda is warned that Marado's jungles are "entirely too dangerous" for a white woman, she persists through dangerous raft rides and wild crocodiles. She discovers that her husband is now the personal physician to the island’s enigmatic prince. The prince lusts for Linda, and a love triangle ensues.

Cast
 Rose Hobart as Linda Randolph
 Charles Bickford as Dr. Allan Randolph
 Georges Renavent as Hashim, Prince of Marudu
 Lupita Tovar as Neila
 Noble Johnson as Osman
 Tetsu Komai as Hrang the Raftsman

Production
The film was shot largely at Universal Studios. Despite being essentially a B-picture, East of Borneo featured elaborate sets. Props and set dressing used in the film were reportedly valued at $100,000; this figure includes a large $25,000 Buddha statue, a very rare small white Buddha and a long mother-of-pearl inlaid bench, silver dinner utensils, and Oriental rugs and drapery.

References

External links

East of Borneo website with synopsis and poster

Universal Pictures films
1931 adventure films
American adventure films
Films directed by George Melford
Films set in Indonesia
American black-and-white films
1930s American films